Mãe Menininha do Gantois (10 February 1894 – 13 August 1986) also known as Mother Menininha do Gantois, was a Brazilian spiritual leader (iyalorixá) and spiritual daughter of orixá Oxum, who officiated for 64 years as the head of one of the most noted Candomblé temples, the Ilê Axé Iyá Omin Iyamassê, or Terreiro do Gantois, of Brazil, located in Alto do Gantois in Salvador, Bahia. She was instrumental in gaining legal recognition of Candomblé and its rituals, bringing an end to centuries of prejudice against Afro-Brazilians, who practiced their faith. When she died on 13 August 1986, the State of Bahia declared a three-day state mourning in her honour, and the City Council of Salvador held a special session to pay tributes to her. The Terreiro do Gantois temple has been declared a protected national monument.

Biography
Maria Escolástica da Conceição Nazaré Assunção was born on 10 February 1894 in Salvador, Bahia. Her grand mother, who had baptized her, gave her the nickname as Menininha meaning "Little Girl" She was born into a matriarchal society to Maria da Glória and Joaquim Assunção, who were Afro-Brazilian with Yoruba Nigerian royal ancestry from Egba-Alakê in Abeokutá, a kingdom in the southwestern part of Nigeria. 
Her great grandparents, Maria Júlia da Conceição do Nazaré and Francisco Nazaré Eta, were the first blacks to be freed from slavery. Menininha was initiated into the worship of deities at the Terreiro do Gantois when she was 8 years old by her grandmother Maria Julia da Conceição Nazaré who had built the temple "Ile Iyá Omi Axé Iyamassê". She was married to Alvaro MacDowell de Oliveira and they had two daughters. The elder daughter was Mãe Cleusa da Conceição Nazaré de Oliveira, born in 1923, who was a doctor and who became the inherited Candomblé priestess of the temple after her mother's death. She died in 1998 and was succeeded by Menininha's other daughter, Mãe Cleusa. As spiritual heads of their temple, all of the Candomblé priestesses receive the honorific 'mãe', which in the Portuguese language means "mother".

Career
The temple, which she headed was established by her grandmother Mãe Pulquéria following a dispute over leadership from Engenho Velho, an older temple said to be one of the oldest Candomblé temple (1830 or even 100 years older) in Bahia which had been built by three freed African women. Two temples were built, one was the Terreiro do Gantois built in 1900 by Mãe Pulquéria and the other was Ile Axe Opo Afonja credited to Mãe Aninha. Mãe Pulquéria, who was the functional head of the Terreiro do Gantois, died suddenly in 1918. As she had no children, her niece Maria da Glória Nazaré was designated as her successor, but Maria died in 1920 before assuming office. Then according to hierarchical rights the temple was given to Mother Menininha. This process was confirmed by deities Oxóssi, Shango, Oshun and Babalú-Ayé. Once chosen and confirmed in 1922 Menininha became the head of the Candomblé do Gantois. She dedicated her life to the temple and for the cause of the African religion of Candomblé which represented to her the "last stronghold of the black dignity". She faced persecution at the hands of the Brazilian government and even incarceration, as well as being subjected to harassment. She defended the African-Brazilian traditions of worship at the Terreiro do Gantois and other Terreiros at Engenho Velho and Casa Branca. Her struggle, in association with other well known candomblé priestesses like Stella de Oxossi, asserted the Africanness of Candombé, stressing the fact that their religion was not the same as Roman Catholicism.

One of the reasons she became prominent was that she initiated hundreds of "daughters" into the faith, as well as artists, and invited the academic community to study the roots of the religion. One of those academics, Ruth Landes compiled her findings and published a book, City of Women (1947) discussing how the racial policies of the government were intertwined with the Candomblé religious rites. These studies were influential in furthering research on the Nigerian roots of the religion, but at the same time brought criticism from other temples in the faith that Menininha was exploiting the religion. However, her success in obtaining legalization of the religion in the 1970s facilitated the first freedom to practice their faith in hundreds of years and began the process of eliminating prejudice against other Afro-Brazilian faiths.

Legacy
Menininha died at the age of 92 on 13 August 1986. At the special session held in the City Council of Salvador to commemorate her death, Edvaldo Britto, Deputy Mayor; Pedro Godinho, President of the House; her friends; and  attended. Veloso paid a tribute to the mother by highlighting her role as the priestess in leading the resistance and fighting against discrimination and religious faith. Her successor to the temple was her daughter Cleusa who was chosen as priestess in 1989. Upon Cleusa's death, the deities chose her younger sister,  to succeed her. Menininha became a symbol of motherhood and spiritual daughter of the Orixa Oxum. Her ritual chair, which appears like a throne, is placed at the entry to the city museum in Salvador.

Poems 
Many songs have been written paryear songs seeking her blessings and spiritual guidance. Beth Carvalho, a famous singer paid tribute to her in his composition titled O Encanto do Gantois'', in 1985. One of these poems reads:
 Prayer to Mother Menininha'''Oh my motherMy Mother MenininhaOh my motherThe little girl GantoisThe most beautiful star,  huh? It's in the Gantois And the brightest sun, huh? It's in the GantoisThe beauty of the world, huh? It's in the Gantois And the hand of sweetness, huh? It's in the GantoisThe comfort us, eh? It's in the GantoisAnd Oshun more beautiful, huh? It's in the Gantois Olorun who sent This daughter of Oshun Take care of us  And all that is Olorun who sent ô ô Now yeh yeh ô ...Now yeh yeh ô

Notes

References

Bibliography

1894 births
1986 deaths
Brazilian women
Brazilian Candomblés
People from Salvador, Bahia
Female religious leaders
Brazilian civil rights activists
Afro-Brazilian culture
Iyalawos
Brazilian people of Nigerian descent
Brazilian people of Yoruba descent
Brazilian people of Belgian descent
Yoruba royalty
Yoruba women